Villar-Perosa may refer to:

Villar Perosa, an Italian comune
Villar-Perosa aircraft submachine gun

See also 
 Perosa (disambiguation)